Archibald Douglas, 1st Duke of Douglas (15 October 1694 – 21 July 1761) was a Scottish nobleman.

Early life
He was the second son of James Douglas, 2nd Marquess of Douglas, by his second marriage to Lady Mary Kerr, daughter of Robert Kerr, 1st Marquess of Lothian and Lady Jean Campbell. His elder brother, William, died in infancy in 1694, and Archibald was thereafter styled Earl of Angus.

Douglas succeeded his father in 1700, and on 10 April 1703, was created Duke of Douglas, Marquess of Angus and Abernethy, Viscount of Jedburgh Forest, and Lord Douglas of Bonkill, Prestoun, and Robertoun. The bearer of the Crown of Scotland on state occasions, he conveyed it to Edinburgh Castle after the closing of the last Parliament of Scotland.

Career
During the Jacobite rising of 1715, Douglas took the Hanoverian side, and led the volunteer horse at the Battle of Sheriffmuir. In maturity, Douglas grew eccentric, and perhaps insane, slew Captain John Kerr (the natural son of his uncle, Lord Mark Kerr) at Douglas Castle, while the latter was guesting with him there, and was forced to flee for some time to Holland. His residence of Douglas Castle was plundered by Highlanders during the Rising of 1745.

Personal life
He fell out with his sister, Lady Jane Douglas, when he discovered her secret marriage to Sir John Stewart, 3rd Baronet of Grantully, and treated her with great cruelty. In 1755, Douglas Castle burned, and he hired Robert Adam to rebuild it, although the work was never finished, being halted by the Duke's death.

In 1758, Lord Douglas married Margaret Douglas, daughter of James Douglas of Mains, who succeeded in reconciling him with Archibald, his nephew by Lady Jane (who had died in 1754). Ultimately, the Duke was persuaded to entail his estates upon Archibald, a decision which led to the celebrated Douglas Cause upon his death, when the Duke of Hamilton (who inherited the Marquessate of Douglas) and his kin unsuccessfully contested Archibald's legitimacy.

Ancestry

References

1694 births
1761 deaths
Dukes in the Peerage of Scotland
Archibald Douglas, 01st Duke of Douglas
People of the Jacobite rising of 1715
03